Zegyo Market, located in central Mandalay, is the oldest and most important market in Mandalay.

History
Zegyo Market, covering 12 acres (4.86 hectares), was founded during the reign of King Mindon. It was a principal distribution centre for beans, citrus fruit, cotton, nuts, onions, rice, tobacco and wheat as well as the main market for jewellery and handicrafts such as silver and gold embroidery. The market was destroyed by fire in 1897, and rebuilt in 1903 with a masonry structure designed by an Italian, Count Conte Calderari. In the 1990s, the colonial era structure was pulled down and replaced with a Chinese-style shopping centre.

References

Mandalay
Shopping malls and markets in Myanmar